Edward S. Owen (July 18, 1946 – August 1, 2008) was an American Paralympian.  He participated in the seven Paralympic Games from 1964 to 1988, winning nine gold medals, two silver medals and two bronze medals.

References

External links
 

1946 births
2008 deaths
Medalists at the 1964 Summer Paralympics
Medalists at the 1968 Summer Paralympics
Medalists at the 1972 Summer Paralympics
Medalists at the 1976 Summer Paralympics
Medalists at the 1988 Summer Paralympics
Swimmers at the 1964 Summer Paralympics
Swimmers at the 1968 Summer Paralympics
Swimmers at the 1972 Summer Paralympics
Athletes (track and field) at the 1968 Summer Paralympics
Athletes (track and field) at the 1972 Summer Paralympics
Athletes (track and field) at the 1976 Summer Paralympics
Table tennis players at the 1968 Summer Paralympics
Wheelchair fencers at the 1968 Summer Paralympics
Wheelchair basketball players at the 1988 Summer Paralympics
Paralympic swimmers of the United States
Paralympic track and field athletes of the United States
Paralympic table tennis players of the United States
Paralympic bronze medalists for the United States
Paralympic silver medalists for the United States
Paralympic gold medalists for the United States
American male fencers
Paralympic medalists in athletics (track and field)
Paralympic medalists in swimming
Paralympic medalists in wheelchair basketball
American male swimmers
Wheelchair discus throwers
Wheelchair javelin throwers
Wheelchair shot putters
Club throwers
Paralympic discus throwers
Paralympic javelin throwers
Paralympic shot putters
Paralympic club throwers
American male discus throwers
American male javelin throwers
American male shot putters
20th-century American people